Danielle Legros Georges is a Haitian-born American poet, essayist and academic. She is a professor of creative writing in the Lesley University MFA Program in Creative Writing. Her areas of focus include contemporary American poetry, African-American poetry, Caribbean literature and studies, literary translation, and the arts in education. She is the creative editor of sx salon, a digital forum for innovative critical and creative explorations of Caribbean literature.

Biography
Danielle Legros Georges was born in Gonaïves, Haiti. Her family lived in the Democratic Republic of the Congo before settling in Boston, Massachusetts. She has lived and worked in Chicago and New York.

After graduating from Emerson College with a bachelor's degree in Communication Studies, she became part of the Dark Room Collective of Black writers, and went on to earn a master's of fine arts degree in English and creative writing from New York University.

She is a professor in the Creative Arts in Learning Division of Lesley University.

Her poetry has appeared in many literary journals – including Agni, The Boston Globe, Transition, World Literature Today, SpoKe, SX Salon, The Caribbean Writer, Callaloo, Salamander, Poiesis, Black Renaissance Noire, MaComère, and The American Poetry Review – and has been widely anthologised, including in New Daughters of Africa (edited by Margaret Busby, 2019). Her debut book of poems, Maroon, was published in 2001 by Northwestern University Press. Her second collection, The Dear Remote Nearness of You (Barrow Street Press, 2016), won the New England Poetry Club's Sheila Margaret Motton Book Prize. 

In 2014 she was chosen as Boston's poet laureate, the second person to hold the position since the first appointee, Sam Cornish, in 2008. In this ceremonial role she was tasked with raising the status of poetry in the everyday consciousness of Bostonians, acting as an advocate for poetry, language and the arts, and creating a unique artistic legacy through public readings and civic events. As laureate, she established visiting hours for Bostonians interested in discussions of poetry in branches of the Boston Public Library; created a senior writing workshop for residents of the Mount Pleasant Home and elders of the area community; visited area schools; wrote occasional poems for civic events including the Mayor's State of the City addresses of 2015 and 2016, and the re-opening of the Boston Public Library's Central Branch; and collaborated with poets and poetry organizations in public art projects. As the city laureate, Legros Georges collaborated with Boston-area museums, libraries, artists and students; and represented Boston internationally at literary festivals. In a 2016 interview, she said: "I work on reflecting the vibrancy and life of the city of Boston, my commitment is to the community, and the city's diversity." Her term of office as laureate ran from 2015 to 2019.

Awards
Awards and accolades include:

 2012: Massachusetts Cultural Council Finalist in Poetry
 2013: Black Metropolis Research Consortium Fellowship/Andrew W. Mellon Grant  
 2014, 2015, 2016, 2018, 2019, 2020, 2021: Pushcart Prize Nominations
 2014: Massachusetts Cultural Council Artist Fellowship in Poetry 
 2015: Brother Thomas Artist Fellowship, The Boston Foundation 
 2016: Honorary Degree of Doctor of Humane Letters, Emerson College
 2016: Sheila Margaret Motton Book Prize for The Dear Remote Nearness of You, New England Poetry Club
 2017: Champion of Artists Award, Massachusetts Artists Leaders Coalition
 2017: The 1804 List of Haitian-American Changemakers in the United States, The Haitian Roundtable
 2021: PEN/Heim Translation Grant
 2022: MASS MoCA (Massachusetts Museum of Contemporary Art) Fellowship
 2022: Massachusetts Cultural Council Artist Fellowship in Poetry

Bibliography
 Island Heart: The Poems of Ida Faubert (translations) (Subpress Books, 2021)
 City of Notions: An Anthology of Contemporary Boston Poems (Boston Mayor's Office of Arts and Culture, 2017)
 Letters From Congo (a chapbook) (Central Square Press, 2017)
 The Dear Remote Nearness of You (Barrow Street, 2016)
 Maroon (Curbstone Press, 2001)

References

Living people
21st-century American women writers
21st-century Haitian women writers
American writers of Haitian descent
Emerson College alumni
Haitian emigrants to the United States
Haitian women poets
Municipal Poets Laureate in the United States
New York University alumni
People from Gonaïves
People from Mattapan
Poets laureate
Year of birth missing (living people)